The following is a list of schools in Nagaland.

Kohima District

Kohima 
 Dainty Buds School
 Fernwood School
 G. Rio School
 Mezhür Higher Secondary School
 Ministers' Hill Baptist Higher Secondary School
 Northfield School
 Rüzhükhrie Government Higher Secondary School

Viswema 
 John Government Higher Secondary School

Dimapur District

Dimapur 
 Don Bosco Higher Secondary School

Mokokchung District

Mokokchung 
 Edith Douglas Higher Secondary School

Longnak 
 Jawahar Navodaya Vidyalaya

Peren District

Punglwa 
 Sainik School

Zünheboto District

Zünheboto 
 Immanuel Higher Secondary School

See also 
 List of institutions of higher education in Nagaland
 Lists of universities and colleges
 List of higher education and academic institutions in Kohima
 Education in Nagaland

References 

 
Schools in Nagaland